Rector (Latin for the member of a vessel's crew who steers) may refer to:

Style or title
Rector (ecclesiastical), a cleric who functions as an administrative leader in some Christian denominations
Rector (academia), a senior official in an educational institution
 Rector of the University of Edinburgh
Rector (politics)
Rector (Ragusa), an official in the government of the Republic of Ragusa
Rector (Islam) – the leading official of the Grand Mosque of Paris and of some other mosques

Surname
Rector (surname)
David the Rector (1745–1824), Georgian pedagogue

Places

United States
Rector, Arkansas, city
Rector, Missouri, extinct town
 Rector, Pennsylvania, unincorporated community
 Rector Reservoir, a reservoir in Napa Valley, California

Other
Rector Street (IRT Broadway–Seventh Avenue Line), a station on the IRT Broadway–Seventh Avenue Line of the New York City Subway
Rector Street (BMT Broadway Line), a station on the BMT Broadway Line of the New York City Subway
Rector Street (IRT Ninth Avenue Line), a station on the demolished IRT Ninth Avenue Line
Rector Street (IRT Sixth Avenue Line), IRT station was a station on the demolished IRT Sixth Avenue Line in Lower Manhattan
 Rector Street (Manhattan), a street in the financial district of New York City
Rector High School, a public high school in Rector, Arkansas, United States
Rector House, a historic house in Heber Springs, Arkansas
Rector Log Barn, a historic barn in rural Izard County, Arkansas
Rector Road Bridge, a historic truss bridge in Denton, Texas. 
 Rector School District
Rector Waterworks Building, a historic building in Rector, Arkansas

See also 
Rector Street (disambiguation)
Justice Rector (disambiguation)
John Rector (disambiguation)